Juan Carlos García Sancho Orozco (born 10 November 1994) is a Mexican professional footballer who plays as a centre-back for Sonora.

References

External links
 
 

1994 births
Living people
Association football central defenders
Mexican footballers
Cruz Azul footballers
Lobos BUAP footballers
Correcaminos UAT footballers
Liga MX players
Ascenso MX players
Liga de Expansión MX players
Footballers from Nayarit
People from Tepic